Moisés Adrián Velasco Herrera (born 19 October 1989) is a Mexican former professional football midfielder who last played for Veracruz.

He played with Atlético Veracruz of the Liga de Balompié Mexicano during the league's inaugural season, leading them to a runners-up finish after losing to Chapulineros de Oaxaca in the finals.

Honours
América
Liga MX: Apertura 2014
CONCACAF Champions League: 2014–15

References

External links
 
  
 
 
 

1989 births
Living people
Deportivo Toluca F.C. players
San Luis F.C. players
Chiapas F.C. footballers
Querétaro F.C. footballers
Club América footballers
Dorados de Sinaloa footballers
Correcaminos UAT footballers
Potros UAEM footballers
Alebrijes de Oaxaca players
Liga MX players
Ascenso MX players
Footballers at the 2007 Pan American Games
Sportspeople from Tijuana
Footballers from Baja California
Mexican footballers
Association football midfielders
Pan American Games competitors for Mexico
Liga de Balompié Mexicano players